Senate elections were held in Haiti with a first round on 20 November 2016, and a second on 29 January 2017. The first round were held simultaneously with the presidential elections and the second round of the parliamentary elections that still had a run-off pending in some constituencies since 2015.

On 10 August 2016, authorities published the list of candidates for the renewal for a third of the Senate.

Originally scheduled for 9 October, the elections were postponed until 20 November 2016 because of Hurricane Matthew, and a new date announced.

Results 
Two candidates were elected in the first round of the elections as they obtained an absolute majority or a difference or more than 25% over their immediate runner-up: Wanique Pierre (PHTK) in the Nord-Est constituency and Joseph Lambert (KONA) in the Sud-Est constituency. The other 8 remaining constituencies had a run-off to decide the senators elected. Preliminary results were published on 3 February. The final results will be available after a two-week challenge period and the handling of possible cases.

Grand'Anse, Grand'Anse constituency 
 Jean Rigaud Belizaire (Consortium) 52.83%
 Riche Andris (OPL) 45.92%
 Against all  1.25%

Grand'Anse, Roseaux constituency 
 Ronald Toussaint (Inite Patriyotik) 50.31%
 David Nicolas Clerie 49.45%
 Against all 0.24%

Ouest 
 Patrice Dumont (Rassemblement des Patriotes Haïtiens – RPH) 57.40%
 Fednel Monchéry (PHTK) 40.13%
 Against all  2.47%

Nord 
 Jean Marie Ralphe Fethiere (PHTK) 56.34%
 Theodord Saintilus (Pitit Dessalines) 41.52%
 Against all  2.14%

Nord-Est 
 Wanique Pierre (PHTK) 58.74% is elected in the first round

Centre 
 Rony Celestin (PHTK) 49.59%
 Abel Descollines (KID) 49.50%
 Against all  0.91%

Artibonite 
 Garcia Delva (AAA) 53.85%
 Marc Antoine Aldorphe (Bouclier) 43.07%
 Against all  3.08%

Sud 
 Pierre François Sildor (PHTK) 57.77%
 Fritz Carlos Lebon (Fanmi Lavalas) 40.66%
 Against all  1.57%

Sud-Est 
 Joseph Lambert (KONA) 53.78% is elected in the 1st round

Nippes 
 Denis Cadeau (Bouclier) 59.45%
 Louberson Vilson (Fanmi Lavalas) 39.44%
 Against all  1.11%

Nord-Ouest 
 Kedlaire Augustin (PHTK) 65.50%
 Francois Lucas Sainvil (MOSANOH) 32.28%
 Against all 2.23%

References 

2016-2017
2016 elections in the Caribbean
2017 elections in the Caribbean
2016 in Haiti
2017 in Haiti
2016
November 2016 events in North America
January 2017 events in North America